16th district may refer to:

France 
16th arrondissement of Marseille
16th arrondissement of Paris

United States

Congressional districts 
California's 16th congressional district
Florida's 16th congressional district
Illinois's 16th congressional district
Massachusetts's 16th congressional district
Michigan's 16th congressional district
Missouri's 16th congressional district
New York's 16th congressional district
Ohio's 16th congressional district
Pennsylvania's 16th congressional district
Texas's 16th congressional district
Virginia's 16th congressional district

State districts 
California's 16th State Senate district
16th Legislative District (New Jersey)
Pennsylvania House of Representatives, District 16
Pennsylvania Senate, District 16
Texas Senate, District 16
16th Utah Senate District
Virginia Senate, District 16
Wisconsin Senate, District 16